Tom Burns (13 October 1916 – 16 July 1993) was an  Australian rules footballer who played with Geelong in the Victorian Football League (VFL).

He served in the Australian Air Force during World War Two.

Notes

External links 

1916 births
1993 deaths
Australian rules footballers from Victoria (Australia)
Geelong Football Club players
Royal Australian Air Force personnel of World War II
Royal Australian Air Force airmen